The Barber and Winters families are fictional characters and families on the CBS Daytime soap operas The Young and the Restless and The Bold and the Beautiful. Introduced by the series creator, William J. Bell in 1990 and 1991, respectively, the Barber and Winters family are the only core African American families within the series. Sisters Drucilla and Olivia Barber were known for their ongoing romantic relationships with brothers, Neil and Malcolm Winters. The family is currently represented by patriarch, Neil, "his" daughter, Lily Ashby (Drucilla and Malcolm's biological daughter), and his adopted son, Devon Hamilton. In 2011, The Bold and the Beautiful connected Justin Barber, and his son Marcus Forrester to the Barber family of Genoa City.

Family members

First generation
 Walter Barber (Henry Sanders, Bennett Guillory)  Walter is the father of Olivia and Drucilla and husband of Lillie Belle. Walter also has a brother named Wesley. Walter and Lillie Belle come to town in 1990. Lillie Belle always resents Drucilla and favors Olivia as who was the only planned pregnancy. Walter however loves both his daughters equally. Lillie Belle and Walter later separate and she moves in with Olivia and her husband, Nathan. Lillie begins causing problems until Walter returns to take her home.
 Wesley Barber (Mentioned character)  Wesley is the brother of Walter Barber. He is married to Valerie Lowell and they have a son named Justin. Wesley and Valerie were only briefly mentioned on The Bold and the Beautiful.
 Ellis Winters (Mentioned character)  Neil and Malcolm's father; 
 Lucinda Winters (Nichelle Nichols)  Neil's estranged mother who walked away from her family when Neil was young due to her alcoholism. Lucinda and Neil are briefly reunited in 2016 before she passes away on September 5.

Second generation
 Neil Winters Kristoff St. John  Neil is the patriarch of the Winters family, and older half-brother of Malcolm. A very straight edged guy, Neil worked his way up in the Genoa City business community. Neil comes to town in early 1991, and briefly dates Olivia. However, he falls in love with Drucilla and they marry from 1993 to 1997. During their first marriage, Neil and Drucilla welcome their daughter, Lily. Lily is eventually revealed to be Malcolm's child conceived from a one-night stand with Dru. Neil and Dru remarry in 2003 and later adopt a son, Devon Hamilton. Dru is presumed dead in 2007. Neil later marries Karen Taylor, but their marriage is destroyed by Devon's aunt, Tyra. In 2011, Neil has an affair with Malcolm's wife, Sofia, and fathers her son, Moses. Sofia and Neil later marry, but the marriage is short lived. Neil then had a relationship with Leslie Michaelson (Angell Conwell). On April 23, 2019, Devon found Neil died of massive stroke in his sleep.
 Malcolm Winters (Shemar Moore)  Malcolm is street wise younger brother of Neil. Malcolm comes to town in 1994 and starts a career in photography. Malcolm be smitten by Drucilla and they eventually sleep together. Drucilla assumes Neil is Lily's father, and she later fixes Malcolm up with Keesha Monroe. Malcolm and Keesha marry in 1996, only for her to die from AIDS shortly after. Malcolm later falls for Olivia, and they marry in 1997. However, Olivia's insecurities lead to the end of the marriage. In 2002, Malcolm is presumed dead in Kenya. Malcolm returns in 2004 and demands a paternity test for Lily which proves he is Lily's father. In 2009, Malcolm (Darius McCrary) returns working for Tucker McCall (Stephen Nichols). He later marries his co-worker, Sofia Dupre. However, karma comes back to bite him as Sofia and Neil have an affair which produces a son. Malcolm divorces Sofia and leaves town in October 2011.
 Olivia Barber (Tonya Lee Williams) Olivia, is the oldest child of Walter and Lillie Belle, and is favored by her mother, because she is the planned child. Lillie Belle's actions cause a rivalry between the sisters, and leads to Liv resenting her mother for treating Dru differently. Olivia graduated from the University of Colorado at Boulder, and obtained her medical degree from Seton Hall University. Olivia first appeared in 1990 when her sister Drucilla is picked up for shoplifting. Olivia briefly dates Neil, but later marries Detective Nathan Hastings, and they eventually welcome their son, Nathan, Jr. in 1992. During her pregnancy Olivia is diagnosed with ovarian cancer and undergoes a hysterectomy. Olivia and Nathan divorce in 1996, and he dies that summer. Olivia and Malcolm marry in 1997, but her insecurities lead to the end of their marriage. However, Nathan, Jr. sees Malcolm as a father. Olivia later has an affair with her best friend Ashley Abbott (Eileen Davidson)'s husband, Brad Carlton (Don Diamont). Olivia is devastated when Malcolm is presumed dead in 2002, and furious when Malcolm is revealed to be alive in 2004 as she resents him for allowing "their" son to mourn him. In 2005, Olivia goes to Africa to work for "Doctors Without Borders." Olivia returns in 2007 when Dru is presumed dead and has made several returns since. In February 2011, Olivia briefly appears on The Bold and the Beautiful and establishes her family's connection to the Barber family of Los Angeles.
 Drucilla Barber (Victoria Rowell) Sick of her mother's treatment, Drucilla runs away from home and is later picked up for shop lifting. After Nathan teaches her how to read, Dru falls for Neil and they marry in 1993. In 1994, Drucilla, while high on cold medication, has an affair with Malcolm, and they agree to keep the affair a secret. Neil and Dru welcome their daughter Lily in 1995, as Dru's modeling career puts a strain on their marriage. The couple divorces in 1998. In 2000, Dru and Lily move to Paris where Dru continues modeling. Dru and a teenage Lily return in 2002 to help Neil overcome his alcoholism, and they remarry in 2003. In 2004, Neil and Dru take in Devon, whom they eventually adopt. Lily's paternity reveal in 2006 puts a strain on the marriage which leads to Neil's affair with Carmen Mesta (Marisa Ramirez). Dru is a prime suspect Carmen ends up dead; Carmen's real killer is revealed. In 2007, during a photo shoot, Dru falls off a cliff and is presumed dead.
 Justin Barber (Aaron D. Spears) Justin is the son of Wesley Barber and Valerie Lowell, and originally from Sherman Oaks, California. Justin comes to Los Angeles to help Bill Spencer, Jr. (Don Diamont) in his battle with Forrester Creations. Justin reunites with his high school sweet heart, Donna Logan and discovers he fathered her son Marcus. Justin and Donna eventually rekindle their romance and remarry in February 2011 as Justin builds a relationship with their son. Justin's cousin Olivia attends the wedding which confirms that he is related to the Barbers of Genoa City. Justin and Donna's marriage quickly dissolves as they realize they are not in love. However, the two remain friends after their divorce and are doting grandparents for Marcus's daughter, Rosie.

Third generation
 Nate Hastings (Sean Dominic) Nate, born Nathan Oliver Hastings on September 22, 1992, is Olivia's son with Nathan Hastings, Sr. Nate is born prematurely due to his mother's ovarian cancer. In 1996, Nate wanders away from Nathan on a crowded street which leads to Nathan's death when he is hit by a car. Olivia later marries Malcolm, who helps her raise Nate. Nate comes to see Malcolm as his father. Upon their divorce, Olivia and Malcolm battle for custody, and Malcolm wins. When Malcolm is presumed dead in 2002, Brad Carlton (Don Diamont) tries to step in as a father figure for Nate; however, Nate decides to attend boarding school. In 2008, Olivia mentions that Nate is attending Johns Hopkins Medical School. Nate (Walter Fauntleroy) returns in 2011 to consult on a case at Genoa City Memorial Hospital. He moves in with Lily when she mourns the death of her husband, and returns to home in April 2011.
 Lily Winters Ashby (Christel Khalil)  Lily is born on June 26, 1995, to Neil and Drucilla. Neil and Dru divorce in 1998, and Lily moves to Paris with her mother in 2000. In 2002, Lily returns home and helps Neil come overcome his alcohol addiction. A teenaged Lily is seduced by Kevin Fisher (Greg Rikaart), who gives her chlamydia. Lily later falls for Daniel Romalotti and they marry in 2006. However, Lily's life is turned upside down when she learns that Malcolm is her biological father. They divorce in late 2007, and Lily begins dating the much older Cane Ashby. Lily miscarries Cane's child in 2008, as he marries another woman. Cane and Lily eventually reunite and marry in 2009 only for Lily to be diagnosed with ovarian cancer. The couple is able to salvage two of her eggs, and Mackenzie Browning (Clementine Ford) serves as the surrogate for their twins Charlie and Mattie in 2010. Just as Lily goes into remission, Cane's past comes back to haunt them, and he is presumed dead in February 2011. It is eventually revealed that Cane's twin brother died, and feeling betrayed, Lily divorces Cane. The couple eventually reconciles and remarries in early 2012. On April 23, 2019, Lily was released from prison and she comes back home after Hillary's car crash was killed, Devon tells Lily that Neil passed away from his stroke.
 Marcus Forrester (Texas Battle) In 2008, Marcus comes to Los Angeles and crashes the funeral of Storm Logan (William deVry). He then takes a job at Forrester Creations as he is revealed to be Justin's son with Donna Logan. Marcus is adopted by Donna's then husband, Eric Forrester (John McCook). Marcus later falls for Eric's granddaughter, Steffy; the relationship does not last, but they remain friends. In late 2009, Marcus and Justin are united for the first time and the two build a very strong relationship. In 2010, Marcus has an off screen relationship with Amber Moore which produces their daughter, Rosie. In 2012, Marcus marries Dayzee Leigh.
 Devon Hamilton (Bryton James)  Born on February 7, 1988, Devon is first introduced as a troubled teenager at the Genoa City Rec Center. Lily and billionaire Victor Newman take a liking to Devon; Victor even considers adopting him. Instead, Devon is adopted by Neil and Dru, Lily's parents. Devon has trouble adjusting to being in a stable family unit, but when he finally does, Devon becomes very protective of his family. Between 2006 and 2007, Devon contracts meningitis and loses his hearing completely. He later gets a cochlear implant surgery. From 2007 to 2013, Devon has an enduring romance with Roxanne (Tatyana Ali). In 2011, Devon is revealed to be the grandson of Katherine Chancellor (Jeanne Cooper), and the biological son of Tucker McCall (Stephen Nichols). Though he initially wants nothing to do with Katherine and Tucker, the group eventually work through their differences and form relationships. He also reconnects with his estranged biological mother, Yolanda (Debbi Morgan). Upon Katherine's passing, Devon inherits half of her estate. Devon was married to Hilary Curtis (Mishael Morgan). In 2018, Devon rushed to the hospital to see Hiliary before the car crash with Lily, Charile and Shuana. Devon tells Hilary that the baby died. On Wedding Day, Hilary purposes to Devon before they got married, Hilary died in Devon's arm.
 Moses Winters (Jacob Aaron Gaines) Born on October 11, 2011, Moses is Neil's son with Sofia Dupre. At the time of his conception, Sofia is engaged to Malcolm (Darius McCrary). Sofia discovers she is pregnant shortly after. Sofia hides the truth until she gives birth and orders a paternity test which proves Neil is her child's father. Malcolm files for divorce and skips town. Neil and Sofia marry, but the marriage does not last long as Neil develops feelings for another woman. In 2013, Moses spends Thanksgiving with the Winters family, and Leslie Michaelson (Angell Conwell).

Fourth generation
Charlie (Noah Alexander Gerry) and Mattie Ashby (Lexie Stevenson) In 2010, Lily is diagnosed with ovarian cancer, she undergoes a hysterectomy, but doctors are able to harvest two of her eggs. Lily and Cane decide to start a family, and Mackenzie Browning (Clementine Ford) serves as the surrogate. The twins are born on June 25, 2010. In 2011, when Cane is presumed dead, Lily is left to raise the twins alone. The twins are later kidnapped by Cane's father, Colin Atkinson (Tristan Rogers). Cane is revealed to be alive and rescues them.
Rosie Forrester  Rosie, named after her mother, Ambrosia "Amber" Moore (Adrienne Frantz) is originally believed to be the daughter of Liam Spencer (Scott Clifton). When Amber gives birth on June 20, 2011, it is revealed that she and Marcus had a relationship off screen which resulted in the pregnancy.
Dominic Abbott Newman Chancellor (Rainn and River Ware)  In 2021, Chance Chancellor is unable to have biological children with his wife Abby Newman so Devon volunteers to be the sperm donor.

In-Laws
 Lillie Belle Johnson (Norma Donaldson) - Walter's wife.
 Valerie Lowell (Mentioned character) - Wesley's wife.
 Karen Taylor (Nia Peeples) - Neil's wife. (2008–09)
 Keesha Monroe (Jennifer Gatti) - Malcolm's wife. (1996)
 Sofia Dupre (Julia Pace Mitchell) - Malcolm's wife, and Neil's wife. (2011, 2011–12)
 Nathan Hastings (Nathan Purdee, Randy Brooks, Adam Lazarre-White) - Olivia's husband (1991–96)
 Donna Logan (Jennifer Gareis) - Justin's wife. (2011)
 Daniel Romalotti (Michael Graziadei) - Lily's husband. (2006–07)
 Cane Ashby (Daniel Goddard) - Lily's husband. (2009–11, 2012–)
 Dayzee Leigh Forrester (Kristolyn Lloyd) - Marcus's wife. (2012–)
 Hilary Curtis (Mishael Morgan) - Neil's ex-wife. (2014–15); Devon's wife (2015–17, 2018)

Family tree
Legend

Descendants

Winters

 Ellis Winters; married to Lucinda Winters (divorced); married Unnamed woman
 Neil Winters (died 2019); Ellis and Lucinda's son; married Drucilla Barber (1993–98, 2003–07), Karen Taylor (2008–09), Sofia Dupre (2011–12), Hilary Curtis (2014–15)
 Devon Hamilton (1988–); Neil and Dru's adopted son; married Hilary Curtis (2015–17)
 Dominic Abbott Newman Chancellor (2021-); Devon's biological son with Abby Newman; legal son of Chance Chancellor. 
 Moses Winters (2011–); Neil and Sofia's son.
 Malcolm Winters; Ellis's son from his second marriage; married Keesha Monroe (1996), Olivia Barber (1997–99), Sofia Dupre (2011)
 Lily Winters (1987–); Malcolm and Dru's biological daughter; raised by Neil ; married Daniel Romalotti (2006–07) and Cane Ashby (2009–11, 2012–19).
 Charlie Ashby (2002–); Cane and Lily's twin son.
 Mattie Ashby (2002–); Cane and Lily's twin daughter.

Barber

 Walter Barber; married Lillie Belle Johnson
 Olivia Barber (1960–); Walter and Lillie Belle's oldest daughter; married Nathan Hastings (1991–96) and Malcolm Winters (1996–97)
 Nate Hastings (1987–); Nathan and Olivia's son.
 Drucilla Barber (died 2007); married Neil Winters (1993–98, 2003–07)
 Lily Winters (1987–); Dru's daughter with Malcolm; raised by Neil; married Daniel Romalotti (2006–07) and Cane Ashby (2009–11, 2012–19)
 Charlie Ashby (2002–)
 Mattie Ashby (2002–)
 Devon Hamilton (1988–); Dru and Neil's adopted son; married Hilary Curtis (2015–17)
 Dominic Abbott Newman Chancellor (2021-); Devon's biological son with Abby Newman; legal son of Chance Chancellor. 
 Wesley Barber; Walter's brother; married to Valerie Lowell
 Justin Barber (1969–); married Donna Logan (2011)
 Marcus Forrester (1986–); Justin and Donna's son; married Dayzee Leigh (2012–)
 Ambrosia "Rosie" Forrester (2011–); Marcus's daughter with Amber Moore

References

External links
 
 

The Young and the Restless families
The Young and the Restless characters